Dennis McCarthy may refer to:
Dennis McCarthy (scientist), American scientist
Dennis McCarthy (composer) (born 1945), American composer
Dennis McCarthy (New York politician) (1814–1886), United States congressman and acting lieutenant governor of New York
Dennis McCarthy (radio presenter) (1933–1996), British radio presenter
Denis Florence MacCarthy (1817–1882), Irish poet
Dennis M. McCarthy (born 1945), U.S. Marine Corps general
Dennis McCarthy, shooting victim of Colin Ferguson